Sant Julià de Cerdanyola is a town and municipality in the comarca of Berguedà, in Catalonia.

Geography
The town is located in a high hollow in the Pyrenees of Berguedà, at 1000 meters above sea level. The main access road to the town is a steep, winding highway coming from the town of Guardiola de Berguedà, in the Valley of the Llobregat below.

Celebrations
The town festival is celebrated on 5 December. On Christmas Eve, the inhabitants of the town also celebrate the Fia-Faia, a pre-Christian commemoration of the solstice where bundles of Cephalaria leucanta, called faies, are brought from a bonfire outside town to Plaça Catalunya in the center of town.

References

External links
 Town website 
 Government data pages 

Municipalities in Berguedà